Chill or Chills may refer to:

Arts, entertainment, and media

Games
 Chill (role-playing game)
 Chill (video game), a 1998 snowboarding game for PlayStation One

Music
 "Chill" (Anthony Amorim song), 2017
 "Chills" (Down with Webster song), 2013
 "Chills" (James Barker Band song), 2017
 "Chill" (The Rasmus song), 2001 
 Chills (EP), 2008 EP by Clint Lowery
 Chill & Groove, an electronic music duo
 The Chills, a band from New Zealand
 The Chills, an early 1980s San Francisco area rock band, precursor to The Sorentinos
 "Chill", a track from the soundtrack of the 2015 video game Undertale by Toby Fox
 "Chills", 2019 single by Why Don't We
 Chill-out music, also known as "chill"

Radio stations
 Smooth Chill (UK radio station), a British digital radio station
 RTÉ Chill, an Irish digital radio station
 SiriusXM Chill, an electronica radio station

Other uses in arts, entertainment, and media
 Chill (film), a 2007 low-budget, independent horror film written and directed by Serge Rudnunsky
 Chills (TV series), British television show
 Joe Chill, a character in the Batman series attributed with the murder of Bruce Wayne's parents
The Chill (Macdonald novel), a crime novel by Ross Macdonald
The Chill, a horror novel by Michael Koryta under the pen name Scott Carson

People
 "Chill", a nickname of Daryl Mitchell (born 1965), American actor
 Akhenaton (rapper) (born 1968), French hip hop artist who uses "Chill" as one of his aliases
 Abraham Chill (1912–2004), first Jewish chaplain of the United States Military Academy
 Kurt Chill (1895–1976), German World War II Generalleutnant
 Ollie Chill (1878–1958), American Major League Baseball umpire
 Tha Chill (born 1970), rapper and producer from the hip hop group Compton's Most Wanted
 Chill Wills (1902–1978), American actor and singer

Sports teams
 Colorado Chill, a National Women's Basketball League team from 2004 to 2006
 Columbus Chill, an East Coast Hockey League team from 1991 to 1999
 Coulee Region Chill (NA3HL), a junior ice hockey team of the North American 3 Hockey League based out of Wisconsin
 Edmonton Chill, original name (2007–2008) of the Edmonton Energy, an International Basketball League team in Edmonton, Alberta, Canada
 Green Bay Chill, in the Legends Football League (formerly the Lingerie Football League)
 Palm Springs Chill, an independent baseball team
 St. Charles Chill, a minor league ice hockey team of the Central Hockey League based in St. Charles, Missouri
 Thunder Bay Chill, a Canadian soccer team based in Thunder Bay, Ontario, Canada, in the USL Premier Development League

Other uses
 Chill (casting), an object placed in a mold to (locally) increase the solidification rate of a casting
 CHILL, a consortium of health libraries in London
 CHILL, a programming language
 Chilling (combinatorial game theory), a technique making hot games amenable to the methods of the theory
 Chills, a feeling of coldness during high fevers
 Postpartum chills, or "chills and shivering", that occurs in women after childbirth
Slang for to relax or hang out

See also
 Chiller (disambiguation)
 Chillin' (disambiguation)
 Chilling effect (law), a situation where speech or conduct is suppressed or limited by fear of penalization, also known as "Libel chill"